Hunt is an unincorporated community in western Kerr County, Texas. It is located in the heart of the Hill Country of Texas (the rugged limestone hills that separate the coastal plain from the Edwards Plateau). The city of Hunt sits at the junction of the North and South Forks of the Guadalupe River on Highway 39.

History
The settlement was originally named "Japonica"; it was later changed to "Hunt" when Alva Joy purchased land in the area from Bob Hunt and established a US post office on the site.

The Stonehenge II replica was built on the North Fork north of Hunt. In the summer of 2012, Stonehenge II was moved to the front yard of the Point Theater in nearby Ingram.

Geography
Hunt sits at the confluence of the North and South Forks of the Guadalupe River.

Notable places
The Hunt Store is a quaint local convenience store and gas station sitting right on Highway 39 and held close to the heart of locals.

While the official population of Hunt is 1,332 more than 3,000 campers and family members spend their summer there. This makes summer very lucrative for local business.

Many summer camps for girls call the area around Hunt home, including Camp Mystic for Girls, Camp Waldemar. All-boys camps include Camp Stewart for Boys, Camp LaJunta, and Camp Rio Vista. Co-ed camps in this hilled country include Mo-Ranch.

Since 1972 Hunt, Texas has been the home to La Hacienda Addiction Treatment Center. Hundreds of families have been helped to overcome addiction and alcoholism.

References

External links 
 West Kerr County Chamber of Commerce
 River Info
 Stonehenge II
La Hacienda Addiction Treatment Center

Unincorporated communities in Kerr County, Texas
Unincorporated communities in Texas
Populated places on the Guadalupe River (Texas)